Isabella von Lospichl (born 28 August 1970) is a German former gymnast. She competed in five events at the 1988 Summer Olympics.

References

External links
 

1970 births
Living people
German female artistic gymnasts
Olympic gymnasts of West Germany
Gymnasts at the 1988 Summer Olympics
People from Starnberg
Sportspeople from Upper Bavaria